Rodeo (Spanish for "Cattle roundup") is a census-designated place (CDP) located in Contra Costa County, California, in the East Bay sub-region of the San Francisco Bay Area, on the eastern shore of San Pablo Bay, 25 miles northeast of San Francisco. The population was 8,679 at the 2010 census. The town is named for the rodeos common in the late 19th century. Cattle from the surrounding hills were regularly driven down through the old town to a loading dock on the shoreline of San Pablo Bay for shipment to slaughterhouses, a practice which continued through the early 20th century. The town of Rodeo is served by the Interstate 80 freeway and State Route 4. The Southern Pacific Railroad main line passes through Rodeo. Rodeo has not been a stop on the railroad since the 1950s.

History
Rodeo owes much of its history to brothers John and Patrick Tormey, who purchased tracts of land from the Ygnacio Martinez Rancho El Pinole estate in 1865 and 1867.

They became successful ranchers and businessmen, amassed sizable fortunes and held public office.  Patrick Tormey (for whom the nearby town of Tormey is named) had visions of this area of Contra Costa County becoming the meatpacking and canning center of the Pacific coast.  In partnership with the Union Stockyard Co. in 1890, he sold some of the land to them and began to lay out plans and make large investments for the stockyard facilities. Eventually, streets were graded and lots were prepared for homesteads, thus creating the town of Rodeo.

Patrick Tormey also sold land in the nearby town of Oleum to the California Lumber Co. for use as a lumberyard (which eventually would be sold to the Union Oil Co. for an oil refinery site). He also sold land in nearby Selby, which was used by the Selby Smelting & Lead Co. He funded the meatpacking plant, corrals and the Rodeo Hotel.

The first post office opened in 1892.

After recession in 1893, Patrick Tormey struggled to keep finances going as business began to close, culminating with the bankruptcy of the Union Stockyard Co. Patrick Tormey was plagued with lawsuits over the bankruptcy for the remainder of his life.
Residents were able to find work in nearby towns of Crockett (C&H Sugar), Vallejo (the Mare Island Naval Shipyard), Hercules (Hercules Powder Co.), and Union Oil Co. in Oleum.

Rodeo as a community managed to continue, but was devastated in the 1906 San Francisco earthquake. In the aftermath, the town would rebuild much like other communities around the San Francisco Bay area. There is a large oil refinery adjacent to Rodeo, built in 1896 and currently operated by Phillips 66.

Mike Dirnt (Michael Pritchard) and Billie Joe Armstrong of Green Day were born and lived here.

Geography

Demographics

2010
The 2010 United States Census reported that Rodeo had a population of 8,679. The racial makeup of Rodeo was 3,823 (44.0%) White, 1,410 (16.2%) African American, 53 (0.6%) Native American, 1,762 (20.3%) Asian, 62 (0.7%) Pacific Islander, 885 (10.2%) from other races, and 684 (7.9%) from two or more races. Hispanic or Latino of any race were 2,134 people (24.6%).

The Census reported that 99.5% of the population lived in households and 0.5% lived in non-institutionalized group quarters.

There were 2,920 households, out of which 1,126 (38.6%) had children under the age of 18 living in them, 1,455 (49.8%) were opposite-sex married couples living together, 540 (18.5%) had a female householder with no husband present, 196 (6.7%) had a male householder with no wife present.  There were 175 (6.0%) unmarried opposite-sex partnerships, and 21 (0.7%) same-sex married couples or partnerships. 583 households (20.0%) were made up of individuals, and 207 (7.1%) had someone living alone who was 65 years of age or older. The average household size was 2.96.  There were 2,191 families (75.0% of all households); the average family size was 3.40.

The population was spread out, with 2,128 people (24.5%) under the age of 18, 802 people (9.2%) aged 18 to 24, 2,173 people (25.0%) aged 25 to 44, 2,517 people (29.0%) aged 45 to 64, and 1,059 people (12.2%) who were 65 years of age or older.  The median age was 38.2 years. For every 100 females, there were 95.3 males.  For every 100 females age 18 and over, there were 91.4 males.

The homeowner vacancy rate was 2.3%; the rental vacancy rate was 7.4%.  5,508 people (63.5% of the population) lived in owner-occupied housing units and 3,130 people (36.1%) lived in rental housing units.

2000
As of the census of 2000, there were 8,717 people, 2,882 households, and 2,204 families residing in the CDP. The population density was 1,183.3 inhabitants per square mile (456.7/km). The racial makeup of the CDP was 52.20% White, 16.04% Black or African American, 1.30% Native American, 16.04% Asian, 0.50% Pacific Islander, 7.17% from other races, and 6.76% from two or more races.  17.08% of the population were Hispanic or Latino of any race.

There were 2,882 households, out of which 38.4% had children under the age of 18 living with them, 52.9% were married couples living together, 17.8% had a female householder with no husband present, and 23.5% were non-families. 18.9% of all households were made up of individuals, and 6.4% had someone living alone who was 65 years of age or older.  The average household size was 3.00 and the average family size was 3.42.

In the CDP, the population was spread out, with 29.3% under the age of 18, 8.8% from 18 to 24, 27.7% from 25 to 44, 23.9% from 45 to 64, and 10.2% who were 65 years of age or older.  The median age was 35 years. For every 100 females, there were 94.1 males.  For every 100 females age 18 and over, there were 89.0 males.

The median income for a household in the CDP was $60,522, and the median income for a family was $63,151. Males had a median income of $46,077 versus $32,452 for females. The per capita income for the CDP was $21,432.  6.8% of the population and 6.0% of families were below the poverty line. 8.5% of those under the age of 18 and 6.2% of those 65 and older were living below the poverty line.

Education
The Rodeo Library of the Contra Costa County Library is located in Rodeo.

Famous residents
Rodeo is the hometown of the following: 
 Billie Joe Armstrong (guitar, lead vocals) and Mike Dirnt (bass, backing vocals) of punk rock band Green Day
 Lefty Gomez, Baseball Hall of Fame pitcher for the New York Yankees (active 1930-1943)
 Eric the Actor of the Howard Stern Show.
 Sabrina Rogers - 2x Grammy Winner, Trumpet player with the Mariachi Divas de Cindy Shea

References

External links

Census-designated places in Contra Costa County, California
San Pablo Bay
Census-designated places in California
Populated coastal places in California